LaRay Denzer is an American historian and Academic who has written extensively on African women, in particular the role of women  during the colonial period and during an era of military dictatorships. 

Her efforts contributed to the development of historiography and the academic history of Nigerian women with works such as The Iyalode in Ibadan Politics and Society and a biography of Folayegbe M. Akintunde-Ighodalo.

Selected works

Books

Articles 

 
 
 
 
 
 Guyer J.I., Denzer L. (2013) Prebendalism and the People: The Price of Petrol at the Pump. In: Adebanwi W., Obadare E. (eds) Democracy and Prebendalism in Nigeria. Palgrave Macmillan, New York.

References 

Living people
University of Ibadan
Year of birth missing (living people)
American historians